Medy Ekofo Elito (born 20 March 1990) is a professional footballer who plays as a midfielder for Welling United. Born in Zaire, he represented England internationally at youth levels U17 through U19. Elito is also a rapper who performs under the name Don EE.

Club career
As a teenager, Elito played in the Colchester United Academy. He signed a professional contract with the U's in May 2007, having already played for the U's at youth and reserve team level. He was given the number 30 shirt for the 2007–08 season and made his Colchester debut as a substitute in a 4–1 defeat away at Plymouth Argyle on 4 March 2008. On 29 March 2008, he scored his first professional goal, against West Bromwich Albion in the Championship. At the time it gave Colchester a 2–0 lead, although following a half-time substitution, Elito was helpless as they went on to lose 4–3, and eventually lose their Championship status. On 4 September 2009, he signed a new two-year contract with Colchester United.

Elito signed a monthlong loan at Cheltenham Town on 5 March 2010, and made he debut against Chesterfield a day later. After increasing that loan to the end of the season, Elito scored goals against Darlington, Port Vale as well as a well-timed strike from the edge of the box against Burton Albion, in the 6–5 win.

In November 2010, Elito joined Dagenham & Redbridge on loan until 3 January 2011. He made his debut for Dagenham and scored on 13 November in a 3–1 away win against Yeovil Town.

On 25 February 2011, Elito signed on loan to Cheltenham until the end of the season.

On 28 April, Colchester announced that he would be one of three players who would be released at the end of the season.

On 28 June 2011, Elito signed for League Two side Dagenham & Redbridge on a two-year deal. On 7 January 2013, Elto signed a two-year contract extension. In the summer of 2014, Elito was released from his contract at Dagenham & Redbridge at his own request and was transferred to Dutch side VVV-Venlo in the Eerste Divisie, the second tier of Dutch football.

On 25 June 2015, Elito signed for League Two club Newport County. He made his debut for Newport on 8 August 2015 versus Cambridge United, missing a penalty in the 72nd minute in a 3–0 defeat. Elito scored his first goal for Newport on 19 April 2016 against Oxford United. He was offered a new contract by Newport at the end of the 2015–16 season but the offer was withdrawn and he was released after he failed to accept the contract by the deadline of 10 June 2016.

Elito signed for Cambridge United on 13 June 2016. He scored his first goal for Cambridge in a 2–1 EFL Cup loss against Wolverhampton Wanderers on 23 August 2016. He was released at the end of the 2018 season. Elito joined Barnet on a two-year deal on 27 July 2018. He left the club at the end of the 2019–20 season, having scored twice in 55 games.

After a year out of football, Elito signed for Wealdstone in August 2021. On 11 September 2021, he scored his first goal for Wealdstone, a 101st minute winner from the penalty spot against Altrincham. On 27 July 2022, it was announced that Elito left Wealdstone after his contract wasn't renewed. 

Elito joined Welling United for the 2022–23 season.

International career
In the summer of 2007, he was selected to represent England at the FIFA U17 World Cup in Korea, having previously represented them in the Algarve Tournament, a round-robin tournament held in Portugal. He made a substitute appearance in England's 5–0 win against New Zealand, winning praise from the U17's Head Coach, John Peacock, and also made an appearance in the tournament in the quarter final game with Germany. He received further praise, this time from ex-Us player Perry Groves when he was selected for the England U18 side to face Ghana in November 2007 at Gillingham's Priestfield Stadium, a match in which he came on as a half time substitute for Nathan Porritt, the final result being a 2–0 England win.

Music career
Performing as Don EE, Elito first emerged on the music scene in 2011, when he first featured on Mover’s Ouchchea Vol.1 mixtape on the song ‘Weather’s Not Nice’. He also featured on Mover’s 2nd mixtape Ouchchea Vol.2, singing the hook of song ‘Goodman Move’. However, his first musical breakthrough was when he released his first single, with Pascoli, named "Balenciaga" alongside Kojo Funds, gaining local success. However, Elito is widely known for his single, "You Alright Yeah?", which was released in 2017. The song gained traction after being shared by Beyoncé on Instagram. He has also released tracks featuring Davido and Ms Banks, and performed at Wireless Festival and Wembley Arena.

Career statistics

References

External links

Medy Elito player profile at cu-fc.com

1990 births
Living people
Democratic Republic of the Congo emigrants to the United Kingdom
Democratic Republic of the Congo footballers
English footballers
Footballers from Kinshasa
Association football midfielders
England youth international footballers
English Football League players
National League (English football) players
Eerste Divisie players
Colchester United F.C. players
Cheltenham Town F.C. players
Dagenham & Redbridge F.C. players
VVV-Venlo players
Newport County A.F.C. players
Cambridge United F.C. players
Barnet F.C. players
Wealdstone F.C. players
Welling United F.C. players
English expatriate footballers
English expatriate sportspeople in the Netherlands
Expatriate footballers in the Netherlands
Black British sportspeople
English male rappers
English songwriters
Rappers from London
British male songwriters